Horwich railway station was located in Lancashire, England on a branch from the Manchester to Preston Line. It was closed to passengers on 27 September 1965 and to goods on 25 April 1966.

Opened on 14 February 1870 to serve the town of Horwich (now in Greater Manchester) but by 1884 the land to the east of the branch line, south of the town had been chosen for a major locomotive works.

Horwich railway station closed to passenger traffic on 27 September 1965, and goods the next year.  Thirty-four years later Horwich Parkway railway station opened in 1999, adjacent to the Reebok Stadium. The nearest railway station to Horwich is now Blackrod. The line to Horwich Works remained open until their closure in 1983.

The station has been demolished and the site is a public park.

See also
Horwich Parkway railway station

References

External links
 Horwich Station Website
 Disused Stations Site Record: Horwich

Horwich
Disused railway stations in the Metropolitan Borough of Bolton
Former Lancashire and Yorkshire Railway stations
Railway stations in Great Britain opened in 1870
Railway stations in Great Britain closed in 1966
Beeching closures in England
Demolished buildings and structures in Greater Manchester
1870 establishments in England
1966 disestablishments in England